Live at Kimball's is a live album recorded on April 13, 1985 at Kimball's in San Francisco by Art Blakey and the Jazz Messengers.

Reception

Scott Yanow of Allmusic said this group was "particularly talented, all of its sessions are well worth acquiring by lovers of modern hard bop."

Track listing
 "Second Thoughts" (Mulgrew Miller)
 "I Love You" (Cole Porter)
 "Jody" (Walter Davis, Jr., Wynton Marsalis)
 "Old Folks" (Dedette Lee Hill, Willard Robison)
 "You and the Night and the Music" (Howard Dietz, Arthur Schwartz)
 "Polka Dots and Moonbeams" (Johnny Burke, Jimmy van Heusen)
 "Dr. Jackie" (Jackie McLean)

Personnel 
Art Blakey - drums
Terence Blanchard - trumpet
Donald Harrison - alto saxophone
Jean Toussaint - tenor saxophone
Mulgrew Miller - piano
Lonnie Plaxico  - bass

References 

Art Blakey live albums
The Jazz Messengers live albums
1985 live albums